Dr. Mary Therese Kalin-Arroyo was born in 1944 in New Zealand. She is currently a professor of biology at the University of Chile. Kalin-Arroyo is notable for revising the indigenous genus Ourisia and discovering several new species in New Zealand. Her studies have also led to the designation of central Chile as a biodiversity hotspot.

Early life and education
She earned her BSc honors degree at the University of Canterbury in Christchurch, New Zealand in graduating with first class honours in 1967. She then completed her Ph.D in Botany from UC Berkeley in 1971. The following year, Kalin-Arroyo did a post-doctoral with Peter Raven at the New York Botanical Garden.

In 1978, she married her husband Manuel Arroyo and together with their son, moved to the University of Chile where she would work as an associate professor. Dr. Kalin-Arroyo would later become a full professor in 1984. Currently, she is the director of the Institute for Ecology and Biodiversity at the University of Chile.

Research
Kalin-Arroyo work looks at the reproductive biology of plants, primarily pollinators in high altitudes and the evolution of reproductive systems.  Her second area of research is biogeography, where she is looking at the distribution of high altitude plants. She applied the combined her studies on the reproductive systems of plants with research on complete communities towards conservation.  Furthermore, Dr. Kalin-Arroyo has also conducted conservation work where she evaluated the success of conservation in 16 Chilean protected areas. This has led to central Chile being declared a biodiversity hotspot,.

Another achievement of hers was to obtain an agreement to protect up to 68,000 acres in perpetuity (25%) of the River Condor drainage basin in Chile

Awards
Kalin has received a large number of national and international honors. In 1984 she won the prestigious John Simon Guggenheim Fellowship. In 1998 she was elected "Fellow of the Linnean Society of London" in 1995 and "Corresponding Member of the Botanical Society of America." In 1996 she received the Award of Merit Labarca "in recognition of his outstanding academic achievements in the field of their profession, in the domain of culture and service to country." In 1997-1999 she was awarded a "Presidential Chair in Science" by the President of Chile. In 1998 she was elected "Honorary Fellow of the Royal Society of New Zealand" for her native country. In 1999, along with Ramon Latorre, was chosen "Foreign Member of the US Academy of Science", constituting one of the first two scientists in the country who have received this high honor. In 2003 she joined the Chilean Academy of Sciences as a Corresponding Member. In 2010 she won Chile's National Prize for Natural Sciences.

Bibliography

Taxa
 Acosmium cardenasii   H.S.Irwin & Arroyo
 Gentianella multicaulis (Gillies ex Griseb.)Fabris (syn.Gentianella gilliesii   (Gilg) Martic. & Arroyo nom. illeg.)
Nassauvia coronipappa Arroyo et Martic.
Oriastrum achenohirsutum (Tombesi)A.M.R. Davies (syn. Chaetanthera acheno-hirsuta   Arroyo et al.)

References

1944 births
Living people
New Zealand women scientists
Chilean women scientists
Women botanists
20th-century American women scientists
21st-century American women scientists
New Zealand ecologists
Women ecologists
Chilean phytogeographers
Members of the Chilean Academy of Sciences
UC Berkeley College of Natural Resources alumni
Foreign associates of the National Academy of Sciences